The Ecologist Party (French: Parti écologiste, PÉ), founded as Écologistes !, is a centre-left French political party that holds pro-European views, created in September 2015 by François de Rugy, President of the Europe Ecology – The Greens (EELV) group in the National Assembly and Jean-Vincent Placé, the President of the EELV group in the Senate.

This party was initially created as a reaction to the decision taken by EELV of making alliances with the Left Front. The aim of UDE founders was to create a reformist centre-left party, accepting globalization and market economy, and supporting president François Hollande. The founders of UDE declared they wanted to become a strong ally of the Socialist Party, and attract people from EELV or from the Democratic Movement.

Since 2017, the party is part of La Republique en Marche!.

References

Green political parties in France
Green liberalism
Left-wing parties in France
Pro-European political parties in France